Ottone is a comune (municipality) in the Province of Piacenza in the Italian region Emilia-Romagna, located about  west of Bologna and about  southwest of Piacenza, in the upper Val Trebbia on the Ligurian Apennine. Ottone is the westernmost comune of Emilia-Romagna. The Mount Alfeo is located in its territory.

Pietro Toscanini, great-grandfather of Arturo Toscanini, was born in the Bogli  of Ottone, on 19 May 1769.

References

External links
 Official website

Cities and towns in Emilia-Romagna